Gol (also Romanized as Gul) is a village in Barakuh Rural District of Jolgeh-ye Mazhan District, Khusf County, South Khorasan province, Iran. At the 2006 National Census, its population was 650 in 272 households, when it was in the former Khusf District of Birjand County. The following census in 2011 counted 471 people in 173 households.

The latest census in 2016 showed a population of 489 people in 175 households, by which time the district had been separated from the county and Khusf County established with two new districts. It was the largest village in its rural district.

It is said that about a few centuries ago, Gol had a much larger population than the Khosf, due to better climate and the amount of groundwater. Due to its remoteness from transportation routes and successive droughts and the lack of attention of the rulers to the agricultural activities, its population has been declining throughout history. According to data obtained from elders of the village, the British and Russians were commuting in this place and there are still the remains of the caravanserais where they stopped and rested.

Etymology

Gol's name is derived from factors such as the pleasant climate of the region, fertile soil and the growth of various fragrant flowers, crops and gardens, as well as the settlement of a tribe with this name in the region. At the entrance of Gol, a welcome sign has been installed by rural governors. Then, "Bahar" square is seen with a symbolic "Kharas" stone in the middle, which was used to separate straw from grain with the help of donkeys and cows in ancient times.

References 

Khusf County

Populated places in South Khorasan Province

Populated places in Khusf County